Anastassia Kovalenko-Kõlvart (born 21 September 1991) is an Estonian motorcycle road racer and politician. She is racing in European Junior Cup and is first female racer in Estonian road racing history to race on the international level. She currently holds the title of the best female motorcycle athlete of the year in Estonia. She has been a member of Tallinn city council and is a member of Riigikogu for the Estonian Centre Party since 2022.

Racing career
Kovalenko has been racing motorcycles since 2012 when she was riding a Kawasaki Ninja 250R. In 2013, she moved on to a more powerful bike – Kawasaki Ninja 600R. On the same year she decided to compete in two classes which was not an easy decision. She managed to achieve second place in Superstock 600 B class and third position in C-class. As of 2014 Kovalenko started to ride under Finnish road racing team Kallio Racing Team (owned by MotoGP rider Mika Kallio) where she competed in both Estonian and Finnish championships. Kovalenko won the Superstock 600 B class championship in Estonia in 2014, despite crashing mid-season which ended up with a broken collarbone, and was awarded with the title of the best female motorcycle athlete of the year. In 2015, Kovalenko started to race in European Junior Cup, scoring points in both EJC and the Women’s cup. Kovalenko finished Women's European Cup in second position. On the same year Kovalenko was awarded with the award for the most remarkable moment of the year in motorsports in Estonia. In 2016, Kovalenko started to train with Jorge Lorenzo's father.

Awards
 Best female motorcycle athlete in 2016 (Estonia)
 Women's European Cup 2016 4th place
 Women's European Cup 2015 2nd place
 Award for the most remarkable moment of the year in motorsports (Estonia)
 Best female motorcycle athlete in 2014 (Estonia)
 Winner of B600 cup in 2014
 B600 2nd place in 2013
 C-class 3rd place in 2013

Career in law
Kovalenko studied in Tallinn French School. After finishing it she proceeded to acquire her bachelor's degree in Law in the University of Tartu. During her studies there she also completed the summer law school program at the University of Cambridge. In 2013, she acquired her BA degree and on the same year went on to acquire her master's degree in Law in University of Tartu. She was specializing primarily in the field of white-collar crime. Her master's degree thesis analyzed the prosecution of money laundering and its predicate offences. After getting her master's degree in law in 2015, Kovalenko continued her studies in MBA. In 2017 Kovalenko obtained her second Master's degree. 
During undergraduate studies Kovalenko worked in one of the leading law offices in Estonia named Sorainen in dispute resolution team (1 month).

Career in politics
She was a member of the Social Democratic Party between 2017 and 2020 and has been representing the Centre Party since 2021. She has been a member of the Tallinn city council and is a member of Riigikogu since 2022.

Personal life
Kovalenko was born in Tallinn, Estonia. She has two younger brothers and three younger sisters as well as three older stepsiblings from her father. She married Mayor of Tallinn Mihhail Kõlvart in 2022.

Publications
"Millisesse Euroopa föderatsiooni?" 08.04.2013, Postimees

References

External links
 Anastassia Kovalenko makes motorsport history
 Särav Anastassia Kovalenko teeb Eesti motospordi ajalugu
 Anastassia Kovalenko tegi Eesti motospordi ajalugu
Ringrajaprintsess Anastassia Kovalenko krooniti aasta parimaks naismotosportlaseks
 FOTOD: Helsingi motomessil esitleti Anastassia Kovalenko uut võistlustsiklit
 VIDEO ja FOTOD: Eesti motokaunitar võttis testisõidul Hispaanias uljalt kurve
 ILUS NAINE JA KIIRE TSIKKEL: Anastassia Kovalenko teeb Eesti motospordi ajalugu
Kaugel naljast! Eesti naisringrajasõitja pääses Mika Kallio mototiimi
Ringrajakaunitar Anastassia Kovalenko tuli Eesti karikavõitjaks
FIM-i pealehel ilmus lugu Eesti motokaunitarist
Vaata, mis toimus Eesti parima naismotosportlase üliseksikal fotosessioonil
Helsingis esitleti Anastassia Kovalenko uue hooaja tsiklit
Eesti naisringrajasõitja lõpetas esimesed testisõidud Soome tiimi eest
 Лучшая мотогонщица Эстонии Анастасия Коваленко выходит на международный уровень
Анастасия Коваленко стала первой эстонской профессиональной мотогонщицей
Мотогонщица Анастасия Коваленко выходит на международный уровень 
Ringrajakaunitar Anastassia Kovalenko tuli Eesti karikavõitjaks
Motonäitsik Anastassia Kovalenkot kohtab talvel Harvardis või Yale'is, suvel Audru ringrajal kihutamas
Värskes Kroonikas kelmikas adrenaliinifänn Anastassia Kovalenko - iga sõit on mugavustsoonist väljumine
VIDEO: Eesti parim naismotosportlane lõpetas esimesed testisõidud Aragonis
Мотогонщица Анастасия Коваленко будет выступать за финскую команду
Анастасия Коваленко признана лучшей мотогонщицей Эстонии!
VIDEO | Motokaunitar Anastassia Kovalenko lõpetas esimesed testisõidud
Спортсменка-красавица сломала ключицу, но выиграла Кубок Эстонии
 ФОТО: Бесстрашная мотогонщица готовится к дебюту в Кубке Европы
Naisringrajasõitja Anastassia Kovalenko tuli Eesti karikavõitjaks
Eesti naismootorrattur sõidab sel hooajal Mika Kallio võistkonnas
 VIDEO ja FOTOD: Anastassia Kovalenko lõpetas esimesed testisõidud Aragonis
Helsingi motomessil esitleti Anastassia Kovalenko uut võistlustsiklit
Ringrajakaunitar tuli Eesti karikavõitjaks
Анастасия Коваленко стала первой эстонской профессиональной мотогонщицей
Королева мотогонок
 Anastassia Kovalenko teeb Eesti motospordis ajalugu
 Helsingis esitleti Anastassia Kovalenko uue hooaja tsiklit

1991 births
Estonian Centre Party politicians
Estonian motorcycle racers
Estonian sportsperson-politicians
Estonian sportswomen
Female motorcycle racers
Living people
Members of the Riigikogu, 2023–2027
Sportspeople from Tallinn
Superbike racers
Tallinn French School alumni
University of Tartu alumni
Social Democratic Party (Estonia) politicians